Below are the rosters for the 1983 FIFA World Youth Championship tournament in Mexico. Those marked in bold went on to earn full international caps. Age as of 2 June 1983, first day of the tournament.

Group A

Head coach:  Les Scheinflug

Head coach:  Park Jong-Hwan

Head coach:  Mario Velarde

Head coach:  Andy Roxburgh

Group B

Head coach:  Benjamin Iojene

Head coach:  Mieczysław Broniszewski

Head coach: Angus McAlpine

Head coach:  José Etchegoyen

Group C

Head coach:  Carlos Pachamé

Head coach:  Gerhard Hitzel

Head coach:  Gao Fengwen

Head coach:  Milouš Kvaček

Group D

Head coach: Jair Pereira

Head coach:  Kees Rijvers

Head coach:  Christopher Udemezue

Head coach:  Nikolay Kiselyov

References

 FIFA pages on 1983 World Youth Cup

Fifa World Youth Championship Squads, 1983
FIFA U-20 World Cup squads